A belt dryer (belt drier) is an apparatus which is used for continuous drying and cooling of woodchip, pellets, pastes, moulded compounds and panels using air, inert gas, or flue gas.

Working principle 
A Belt dryer / Belt cooler is a device designed for the particularly gentle thermal treatment of product. 
The wet product is continuously and evenly applied through an infeed chamber onto a perforated belt. The belt, predominantly in horizontal position, carries the product through the drying area which is divided into several sections. In these cells drying gas flows through or over the wet product and dries it. Each cell can be equipped with a ventilating fan and a heat exchanger. This modular design allows the drying and cooling temperatures to be controlled separately in the different sections. Thus, each dryer cell can be individually controlled and the drying / cooling air flow can be varied in each cell. In addition, the speed of the conveyor belt can be varied what gives an additional parameter for setting of drying time.
The cells can be heated or cooled directly or indirectly, and all heating media, such as oil, steam, hot water or hot gas can be used.
Belt dryers are ideally suited to drying almost any non-flowing product and  more granular products that require a lower throughput capacity.

Design features 
Belt dryers / Belt coolers are designed in modular system. Each belt dryer consists of infeed hopper, conveyor belt and discharge end.
Different kinds of dryers are possible to construct, e.g.
 Single-belt dryer
 Multi-stage dryer
 Multi-level dryer
 Multi-belt dryer

Ventilation options 
In general there are two ways of gas flow pattern. The drying air can flow, according to the treatment process, either through or over the product.

Heat Sources 

HEAT EXCHANGERS:
 These are commonly used for application where a biomass heat source is available such as woodchip boilers to produce hot water or if there is a steam heat source available.

OIL OR GAS FIRED BURNERS:
 If a separate heat source is required a direct fired furnace with diesel, kerosene, LPG or natural gas burner can be used. Alternatively a heat exchanger with the same burner can be used for indirect heating if required.

Exemplary conveyor options 
 Chain-guided wire mesh conveyor
 Chain-guided hinge slat conveyor
 Chain-guided steel plate conveyor
 Chainless wire mesh conveyor

Feeding variations 
 Granulating mill – filter cake or amorphous and paste-like products respectively
 Slewing belt conveyor – sensitive and free flowing products
 Distribution spiral
 Rotatable arm feeding device – stable products
 Plates feeding

Typical applications 
Belt dryers are predominantly used in the following industries:
 Biomass
 Pelleting
 Anaerobic digestate
 Chemical industry
 Pharmaceutical industry
 Food and feeding-stuff industry
 Non-metallic minerals industry
 Plastics industry
 Wood industry
 Ceramics industry

Product examples 

Wood chip, Veneers, wood fiber insulating boards, paints, molding materials, synthetic rubber, superabsorbent polymer, stearate, catalysts, coke, fruits, vegetables, cereals, Woodchip, Wood shavings, Wood pellets, Other feed pellets, Saw dust, Biomass straw, Miscanthus and bagasse, Herbs, Combinable crops, Beans and soya beans, Shredded recycled matter, Sewerage sludge & digestate, Flaked maize, Nuts, Fruit and fruit slices, Compost, Cotton rejects, Extruded pet foods, Finely ground wet chips, Grass, Grass seed, Orange peel, Pulp granulates, Solid shredded waste, Granular & shredded plastic, Poultry manure

Sources and further reading 
 Sattler, Klaus: Thermische Trennverfahren. 3. Aufl. Weinheim: Wiley-VCH, 2001
 Draxler, J.: Skriptum zur Vorlesung Thermische Verfahrenstechnik. Loeben: Mountain Universität, 	2002
 Krischer, O.; Kast, W.:Trocknungstechnik – Die wissenschaftlichen Grundlagen der Trocknungstechnik. 3. Band. 3.Aufl. Berlin: Springer, 1992

References

External links

 Picture of belt dryer for sawdust
 Picture of belt dryer for grass, forage maize and various biomass products

Belt drives
Industrial machinery
Dryers